Fórmula 3 Brasil was a Brazilian Formula Three racing competition, organised by the Vicar and CBA. It is a junior-level feeder formula that uses small single seater Formula Three chassis. The series was disputed from 1989 until 1995 and was revived in 2013, the series replacing Formula 3 Sudamericana in 2014. It was folded again 2017.

Champions

See also
 Formula 3 Sudamericana
 Formula 3 Brazil Open

References

External links
 
 Brazilian Formula 3 Championship at forix.com

 
Auto racing series in Brazil
Formula Three series
Recurring sporting events established in 1989
Recurring sporting events disestablished in 2017
1989 establishments in Brazil
2017 disestablishments in Brazil
Motorsport competitions in Brazil